Lérouville is a commune in the Meuse department in Grand Est in north-eastern France. The now-disused Carrière de Lérouville, or Lérouville Quarry, lies just outside the town. Its fifty-ton crane was the subject of a short write-up in the Scientific American Supplement of 12th August 1893.

See also
Communes of the Meuse department

References

Communes of Meuse (department)